Putino is a rural locality (a selo) and the administrative center of Putinskoye Rural Settlement, Vereshchaginsky District, Perm Krai, Russia. The population was 998 as of 2010. There are 16 streets.

Geography 
Putino is located 27 km west of Vereshchagino (the district's administrative centre) by road. Leushkanovo is the nearest rural locality.

References 

Rural localities in Vereshchaginsky District